Yang Yun-ho (born November 11, 1966) is a South Korean film director and screenwriter. His feature film debut Yuri (1996) screened at the Critics' Week of the Cannes Film Festival. Among the films Yang has directed since are Libera Me (2000), Fighter in the Wind (2004, for which he received a Best Adapted Screenplay nomination at the 2005 Grand Bell Awards), Holiday (2006), Rainbow Eyes (2007), and Grand Prix (2010). He also co-directed the 2009 television series Iris and its film version, Iris: The Movie.

Filmography
Criminal Minds (TV, 2017) - director' 20 epsides
Share the Vision (short film, 2011) - director
Ghastly (2011) - supervising producer
Iris: The Movie (2010) - director
Iris (TV, 2009) - director; 20 episodes
Grand Prix (2010) - director, script editor
Rainbow Eyes (2007) - director, script editor
Holiday (2006) - director, script editor
Fighter in the Wind (2004) - director, screenplay, planner
Libera Me (2000) - director
White Valentine (1999) - director
Zzang (The Best) (1998) - director
Henequen (1997) - assistant director
Mister Condom (1997) - director
Yuri (1996) - director, screenplay, planner
Mom, the Star, and the Sea Anemone (1995) - assistant director
When Adam Opens His Eyes (1993) - assistant director
The Extra Lanes  (short film, 1992) - director, screenplay
Na ÷ Dul (short film, 1991) - lighting

References

External links

South Korean film directors
South Korean screenwriters
Dongguk University alumni
Living people
1966 births